Stephanie Caroline March Benton (born July 23, 1974) is an American actress. She is known for starring as Alexandra Cabot in the crime drama franchise Law & Order, which she played in the NBC series Law & Order: Special Victims Unit (2000–2019) and reprised in other media. The role earned her a nomination for the Satellite Award for Best Television Series – Drama.

March has appeared in the films Head of State (2003), Mr. & Mrs. Smith (2005), Falling for Grace (2006), The Treatment (2006) and Jesse Stone: Night Passage (2006). Following a period of sporadic work, March executive produced and starred in the comedy independent film The Social Ones (2019). She played Akira on the superhero series Naomi (2022).

Early life
March was born in Dallas, Texas, the daughter of John and Laura March, and has a sister, Charlotte. She attended McCulloch Middle School in Highland Park, and Highland Park High School, where Law & Orders Angie Harmon, who played the role of an assistant district attorney on Law & Order, attended concurrently. After her parents' divorce, her mother married Robert Derby. In 1996, March graduated from Northwestern University, where she was a member of Kappa Alpha Theta sorority.

Career

Acting beginnings and Law & Order universe 
At Northwestern University, March played Helena in A Midsummer Night's Dream in Chicago, where she continued to pursue her stage career. In 1997, she made her screen debut in an episode of the CBS series Early Edition. In 1999, March moved to New York and made her Broadway debut in a production of Arthur Miller's Death of a Salesman with Brian Dennehy. She later co-starred in the television film based on the play.

March is best known for her role as Assistant District Attorney Alexandra Cabot on the NBC crime legal drama series Law & Order: Special Victims Unit, who she played as a main character from 2000 to 2003, and reprised in recurring appearances on the show until 2018. The character of Cabot and March's work has earned widespread acclaim, and is often considered one of the best characters and acting performances in the Law & Order franchise. In 2003, at the 8th Golden Satellite Awards, she and her Law & Order: Special Victims Unit co-stars were nominated for the Satellite Award for Best Television Series – Drama.  March additionally reprised her role as Cabot, now the Bureau Chief ADA of the homicide bureau, on the short-lived NBC courtroom drama Conviction, which debuted in spring 2006. The show, which saw March in a leading role and was part of the Law & Order universe, was cancelled after one 13-episode season following a negative reception from critics and audiences.  Despite this, March's acting was praised. Review site Entertain your Brain wrote that "... March, she has already proven herself on Special Victims Unit."

On Special Victims Unit, the character of Cabot was a regular character from 2000 to 2003, and departed in the Season 5 episode "Loss", when Cabot is shot and placed in witness protection. She originally returned to the series in Season 6 episode 16, “Ghost”, when she was taken out of the witness protection program to testify, as a witness, for her attempted murder. She was placed back in witness protection after the trial. She returned to the series for a six-episode arc in Season 10 and then continued as a main character in Season 11. After her departure near the end of Season 11, she returned again in Season 13 as a recurring character. She reprised her role once again in an episode on the show's nineteenth season.

Film roles and The Social Ones 
In 2003, March made her film debut with a supporting role in the political comedy Head of State opposite Chris Rock. She later appeared in the films Mr. & Mrs. Smith, The Treatment, and Falling for Grace, the latter two romantic comedies. March also appeared in the 2009 film The Invention of Lying as the woman Ricky Gervais's character tells the world will end unless she has sex with him. She later co-starred in the independent films Why Stop Now? and Innocence. In 2007, March performed in the Broadway premiere of Eric Bogosian's Talk Radio, starring Liev Schreiber. She also starred in Howard Korder's off-Broadway play Boy's Life alongside Jason Biggs.

March has guest-starred on 30 Rock, Grey's Anatomy, Rescue Me, and Happy Endings. She was cast as a regular character on the short-lived CBS legal comedy-drama Made in Jersey in 2012, but she left the series after the pilot episode. March co-founded the cosmetics company SheSpoke (formerly Rouge) with her business partner Rebecca Perkins in 2013. The company creates custom-made beauty products available online and in-store in SoHo, New York. She starred in the 2015 Adult Swim series Neon Joe, Werewolf Hunter. March played the role of Ivanka Trump in the March 2019 Comedy Central TV movie A President Show Documentary: The Fall of Donald Trump. The 22-minute documentary is a comedic portrayal of the aftermath of Trump's imagined loss of the 2020 presidential election.

On March 9, 2019, The Social Ones premiered at the Hammer Theatre Center in San Jose, California, as part of the 2019 Cinequest Film and Creativity Festival. March is a co-executive producer and portrays one of the lead characters. Laura Kosann wrote and directed the film, which also features Richard Kind, Jackie Hoffman, Debra Jo Rupp, and Peter Scolari. The film won Cinequest's Audience Award for Best Comedy Feature. The Social Ones is an ensemble mockumentary that satirizes social media culture, including its fixation on likes, selfies, and social media influencers. The film gained additional attention because it was written, produced, and directed entirely by women. In a March 2019 interview, March explained how a mostly women's production team compared to one that is primarily run by men: "We were under budget, on time, wrapped early, had fun, zero on-set drama, zero backstage drama, and wholly supportive of one another- both in front of and behind the camera. I have never experienced such a seamless set. No ego. All warmth (meets organization, meets diligence, meets determination). Moms really should be in charge of more businesses."

Return to television 
In 2021, March signed with Echo Lake Entertainment, for management in all areas. She subsequently appeared in the Lifetime biographical television film A House on Fire, where she played Debora Green, a former doctor and convicted murderer. Her performance earned praise from critics and audiences; Sayantani Nath of Meaww.com wrote that the actress showed "incredible finesse and brilliance" and further wrote on March's "impressive acting and realistic depiction of Green's mental anguish and struggles."

It was announced that March would join the cast of The CW superhero series Naomi, where she was set to play the role of Akira; released in 2022, the series earned positive reviews from critics and audiences alike. On auditioning for the role, March told ComicBook that "When I auditioned, the role of Akira was described to me as a, quote, "Ripley-inspired intergalactic badass," and I thought, "Well, yeah, I want to do that." ... so far, I hope that's how it's come across. It's certainly been fun to play."

Personal life
March married tech investor Dan Benton in September of 2017 at their home in Katonah, New York. She was introduced to Benton, the founder of Andor Capital, by a mutual friend in October 2015, several months after her divorce from celebrity chef Bobby Flay.

March  married celebrity chef Bobby Flay on February 20, 2005. She appeared on four of Flay's Food Network shows—Boy Meets Grill, Grill It! with Bobby Flay, Iron Chef America, and Throwdown with Bobby Flay—as a guest judge. According to media reports, March and Flay separated in March 2015 and their divorce was finalized on July 17, 2015.

In January 2010 March became a celebrity ambassador and board member of World of Children Awards and One Kid One World. She is a supporter and board member of Planned Parenthood and an advocate for women's rights. March also serves on the National Advisory Council for the School of Communication at Northwestern University.

March became a celebrity ambassador to World of Children Awards in January 2010. Additionally, she has served as a board member for Safe Horizon, an advocacy organization for victims of crime and abuse. March is an advocate for women's rights and a supporter of Planned Parenthood. In 1938, her great-grandmother Ruby Webster March founded the West Texas Mother's Health Center, which later became part of Planned Parenthood of West Texas.

March wrote an essay, published in June 2016, that detailed her experience with breast augmentation surgery in 2014 and the subsequent removal of the implants due to infection. On September 1, 2017, March married businessman Dan Benton in Katonah, New York. The couple resides on the Upper East Side with Benton’s children from a previous marriage, Katya and Nate, as well as three older children, Alex, Jeff and Mike. In 2018 the couple bought an apartment in the West Village for $34.62 million.

In April 2018 March participated in a variety show fundraiser “A Starry Night” at Northwestern University for the School of Communication. In addition to March, other alumni from the school who participated included Stephen Colbert, Tony Roberts, and Dermot Mulroney.

Filmography

Film

Television

References

External links
 
 Official Talk Radio on Broadway website

Living people
American stage actresses
American film actresses
American television actresses
Northwestern University School of Communication alumni
Actresses from Dallas
20th-century American actresses
21st-century American actresses
American abortion-rights activists
1974 births